The Miss Ecuador 2008 was on March 18, 2008. There were 19 candidates for the national title. The winner was Doménica Saporitti from Guayas. She was crowned by Lugina Cabezas from Pichincha. She represented Ecuador at Miss Universe 2008.

Results

Placements

Special awards

Contestants

Notes

Debuts

 Santo Domingo

Returns

Last compete in:

1999
 Tungurahua

Withdraws

 Imbabura

External links
https://web.archive.org/web/20090217031626/http://www.missecuador.net/home/index.php?option=com_content&task=blogcategory&id=13&Itemid=57
https://web.archive.org/web/20090218020656/http://globalbeauties.com/news/2008/march/ecu.htm

Miss Ecuador
2008 beauty pageants
2008 in Ecuador
Beauty pageants in Ecuador